Alexei Petrov (born 1 February 1983 in Ukhta) is a Russian professional ice hockey defenceman.

Career 
Petrov made his Russian Superleague debut playing with HC Neftekhimik Nizhnekamsk during the 2002–03 season. An unrestricted free agent, he most recently played with HC Sochi of the Kontinental Hockey League (KHL).

Career statistics

References

External links
 

1983 births
Atlant Moscow Oblast players
Dizel Penza players
HC Khimik Voskresensk players
HC Neftekhimik Nizhnekamsk players
HC Sochi players
Krylya Sovetov Moscow players
Living people
Russian ice hockey defencemen
SKA Saint Petersburg players
Torpedo Nizhny Novgorod players
Traktor Chelyabinsk players